Rose of the Yukon is a 1949 American adventure film directed by George Blair and written by Norman S. Hall. The film stars Steve Brodie, Myrna Dell, William Wright, Emory Parnell, Jonathan Hale and Benny Baker. The film was released on January 5, 1949, by Republic Pictures.

Plot

Cast    
Steve Brodie as Maj. Geoffrey Barnett
Myrna Dell as Rose Flambeau
William Wright as Tom Clark
Emory Parnell as Tim MacNab
Jonathan Hale as Gen. Butler
Benny Baker as Jack Wells
Gene Gary as French Frenay
Dick Elliott as Doc Read
Francis McDonald as Alaskan
Wade Crosby as Alaskan
Lotus Long as Eskimo girl
Eugene Sigaloff as Capt. Rossoff

References

External links 
 

1949 films
American adventure films
1949 adventure films
Republic Pictures films
Films directed by George Blair
American black-and-white films
1940s English-language films
1940s American films